The year 2021 is the 28th year in the history of the K-1, an international kickboxing event. The year started with K-1: K’Festa 4.

List of events

K-1: K’Festa 4
K-1: K'Festa 4 was a kickboxing event held by K-1. It was originally scheduled to be held on January 24, 2021, at the Yoyogi National Gymnasium in Yoyogi, Japan, but was later postponed as the Japanese prime minister Yoshihide Suga declared a state of emergency for Tokyo, due to the COVID-19 pandemic. The event was rescheduled for two dates: March 21 and March 28, 2021, to be held at the Tokyo Garden Theater and Nippon Budokan, respectively.

Background

Originally scheduled fights
The event was supposed to be headlined by a match between the reigning K-1 Super Featherweight champion Takeru Segawa and the reigning Krush Super Featherweight champion Leona Pettas.

Former K-1 Heavyweight champion Kyotaro Fujimoto was to make his comeback to kickboxing, following a ten-year hiatus. He is scheduled to fight Kosuke Jitsutaka.

Former K-1 Super Lightweight champion Rukiya Anpo was scheduled to fight Kaito. Yuto Shinohara was set to face Yuma Saikyo, with both fighters coming off a two fight losing skid. Tomoya Yokoyama was to fight TETSU, while Akihiro Kaneko was set to fight Momotaro Kiyama.

2019 K-1 Featherweight GP finalist Jawsuayai Sor.Dechaphan was scheduled to fight Shuhei Kumura, while his brother Masashi Kumura was scheduled to fight Dansiam Ayothaya Fight Gym. The 2017 super welterweight finalist Yasuhiro Kido was scheduled to fight Daiki Matsushita. Former K-1 Super Lightweight champion Masaaki Noiri was scheduled to fight Yodkhunpon Sitmonchai.

The rest of the main card was rounded up with the following fights: Hiroki was to fight Ryuka at lightweight, Mio Tsumura was to fight Mako Yamada at a 46 kg catchweight, Kamlaiphet Pran26 was to fight Daisuke Fujimura at super welterweight, Petchseenil Sor.Puangthong was to fight Miho Takanashi at atomweight and Sina Karimian was to fight Seiya Tanigawa at cruiserweight.

K'Festa 4 Day 1

March 21st event 
The card will be headlined by a rematch between Yuki Egawa and Tatsuya Tsubakihara for the K-1 Featherweight title. The two previously fought at the K-1 World GP 2020 in Osaka, with Tsubakihara winning a majority decision.

In the co-main event, the K-1 Super Lightweight champion Hideaki Yamazaki is scheduled to fight Fukashi Mizutani in a non-title bout.

Former two-time Krush Welterweight title challenger Kaisei Kondo will face Maki Dwansonpong. K-1 and Krush Cruiserweight title challenger Hisaki Kato is scheduled to fight Mahmoud Sattari.

Fight Card

K'Festa 4 Day 2

March 28th event 
The main event bout between Takeru Segawa and Leona Pettas for the K-1 Super Featherweight Championship will serve as the headliner. The heavyweight bout between Kyotaro and Kosuke Jitsutaka was likewise rescheduled. The fight between the former K-1 Lightweight champion Rukiya Anpo and Kaito was scrapped, as Anpo was forced to withdraw due to injury. Yodkhunpon Sitmonchai, Dansiam AyothayaFightGym, Kamlaiphet Pran26 and Petchseenil Sor Puangthong will all be unable to compete due to travel restrictions caused by the COVID-19 pandemic. TETSU versus Tomoya Yokoyama, MIO versus Mako Yamada , Akihiro Kaneko versus Momotaro Kiyama and Hiroki versus Ryuka were all rescheduled for this event as well.

Fight Card

K-1 World GP 2021: Japan Bantamweight Tournament

K-1 World GP 2021: Japan Bantamweight Tournament was a kickboxing event held by K-1 originally scheduled for May 23, 2021, at the Ota City General Gymnasium in Tokyo, Japan. Due to a state of emergancy imposed as a way to combat the COVID-19 pandemic, the event was later rescheduled for May 30, 2021, to be held at the Yokohama Budokan in Naka-ku, Yokohama, Japan.

Background
K-1 Featherweight champion Tatsuya Tsubakihara is expected to face Shuhei Kumura in a non-title bout.

Former K-1 Lightweight champion Kenta Hayashi was scheduled to fight Vitor Tofanelli.

The 2018 Super Featherweight champion Kotaro Shimano was set to fight Sano Tenma at super featherweight.

The event featured an eight-man bantamweight tournament, contested solely by Japanese fighters. Mao Hashimoto was later replaced by Naoki Ōmura.

Momotaro was scheduled to face Narufumi Nishimoto in a featherweight bout. A second featherweight bout announced for the event was contested by TOMA and Yusho Kanemoto.

Junki Sasaki was scheduled to fight in a 56 kg catchweight bout against Rat EiwaSportsGym, the highest he has ever weighed in at. Katsuya Jinbo was to fight Aqil Bukhari at a 75 kg catchweight.

Former Shootboxing Minimumweight champion Mio Tsumura was scheduled to fight the Krush atomweight champion Miyuu Sugawara. A second atomweight bout announced for the event was a matchup between MOE and Yu.

K-1 Japan Bantamweight Tournament bracket

Fight Card

K-1 World GP 2021 in Fukuoka

K-1 World GP 2021 in Fukuoka	 was a kickboxing event held by K-1 on July 17, 2021, at the Fukuoka Convention Center in Fukuoka, Japan.

Background
Gonnapar Weerasakreck was scheduled to make the first defense of his K-1 Lightweight Championship against Taio Asahisa.

Former K-1 Featherweight champion Yuki Egawa was scheduled to fight the two-time Krush Super Featherweight title challenger Tatsuya Oiwa. Egawa later withdrew from due bout due to COVID-19 protocols.

A lightweight bout between Koya Urabe and Fumiya Osawa was announced for the event. It was their fourth meeting, with Urabe having won two of their previous three bouts.

The co-main event saw the former K-1 Super Lightweight champion Rukiya Anpo was scheduled to fight Koki in a welterweight bout. The second welterweight bout saw Kota Nakano face Maki Dwansonpong.

A Cruiserweight bout between K-Jee and Ryo Aitaka was announced for the event.

A welterweight bout between Kota Nakano and Maki Dwansonpong was scheduled for the event.

BigBang Heavyweight champion Kosuke Jitsukata was scheduled to fight the undefeated Naoto Maruyama.

21-fight K-1 veteran Naoki Yamamoto was scheduled to fight Satoru Nariai at super featherweight.

Former Krush Super Featherweight champion Yuma Saikyo was scheduled to fight Tatsuki at lightweight.

A rematch between Miho Takanashi and MARI was announced for the event.

Fight Card

K-1 World GP 2021: Yokohamatsuri

K-1 World GP 2021: Yokohamatsuri was a kickboxing event held by K-1 on September 20, 2021, at the Yokohama Arena in Yokohama, Japan.

Background
The former K-1 lightweight champion Kenta Hayashi was scheduled to face the reigning Krush Super Lightweight titleholder Daizo Sasaki in a super lightweight bout.

Newly crowned Krush Women's flyweight champion Kotomi was scheduled to face Rikako Sakurai in a 53 kg catchweight bout.

Kaito Ozawa was scheduled to face Yuta Kuneida in a featherweight bout.

Hirotaka Asahisa was scheduled to face MOMOTARO in a super featherweight bout. Ryusei Ashizawa was scheduled to face Hirotaka Urabe in the second super featherweight bout of the main card.

A rematch between Yasuhiro Kido and Yutaro Yamauchi at super welterweight was announced for the event, eight years after their first meeting, which Kido won by unanimous decision.,

MMA veteran and Olympic Judo gold medalist Satoshi Ishii was scheduled to make his kickboxing debut against Ryo Aitaka in a super heavyweight bout.

Former K-1 heavyweight champion Kyotaro Fujimoto was scheduled to face the reigning K-1 Cruiserweight champion Sina Karimian in a heavyweight bout.

A one-night welterweight world Grand Prix was held during the event, featuring eight competitors: Rukiya Anpo, Alan Soares, Riki Matsuoka, Maki Dwansonpong, Kona Kato, Masaaki Noiri, Ruku Kojima and Ali Ayinta. On September 8, 2021, it was revealed that Kona Kato had to withdraw from his bout due to COVID-19 related reasons, and was replaced by FUMIYA. Daiku Kazuki was rescheduled to face Darvish Kurogi.

Toshiki Taniyama was scheduled to face the former Krush lightweight champion Yuto Shinohara in a lightweight bout.

A featherweight bout between the reigning Krush Featherweight champion Takahito Niimi and two-time Krush Super Bantamweight title challenger Taito Gunji was announced for the event.

Tatsuki Shinotsuka was scheduled to make his sophomore appearance against Toma Tanabe in a featherweight bout.

A bantamweight bout between two former Krush bantamweight champions, Koki and Akihiro Kaneko, was announced for the main card.

K-1 Welterweight Grand Prix bracket

Fight Card

K-1 World GP 2021 in Osaka

K-1 World GP 2021 in Osaka was a kickboxing event held by K-1 on December 4, 2021, at the Osaka Prefectural Gymnasium in Osaka, Japan.

Background
A K-1 Featherweight Championship bout between the reigning champion Tatsuya Tsubakihara and title challenger Taito Gunji was announced as the main event.

Fight Card

See also
 2021 in Glory  
 2021 in ONE Championship
 2021 in Romanian kickboxing
 2021 in Wu Lin Feng

References

External links
Official website

2021 sport-related lists
K-1 events
2021 in kickboxing
2021 in Japanese sport